The 2005–06 Orlando Magic season was the team's 17th in the NBA. They began the season hoping to improve upon their 36–46 output from the previous season. They matched it exactly, finishing 36–46, but failed to qualify for the playoffs for the second straight season. This season preceded six straight playoff appearances for the Magic. In the off-season, the Magic re-hired head coach Brian Hill for his second stint with the team.

Grant Hill, who was voted as an All-Star last year, was hampered by injuries and was only able to play 21 games this season. In February, Steve Francis was suspended for conduct detrimental to the club and the Magic eventually traded him to the New York Knicks.

Draft picks

Roster

Regular season

Season standings

z – clinched division title
y – clinched division title
x – clinched playoff spot

Record vs. opponents

Game log

Player statistics

Awards and records
 Dwight Howard led the league in total rebounds

Transactions

Free agency

Additions

References

Orlando Magic seasons
2005 in sports in Florida
2006 in sports in Florida